"The Heart Is a Lonely Hunter" is a song written by Mark D. Sanders, Kim Williams and Ed Hill, and recorded by American country music artist Reba McEntire. It was released in February 1995 as the fourth single from her 1994 album Read My Mind. The song reached number one on both the U.S. and Canadian country singles charts that year.

The song debuted at No. 58 for the week of February 18, 1995 and peaked at No. 1 for the week of April 15, 1995.

Chart performance

Year-end charts

References

1995 singles
1994 songs
Reba McEntire songs
Song recordings produced by Tony Brown (record producer)
Songs written by Mark D. Sanders
MCA Nashville Records singles
Songs written by Ed Hill
Songs written by Kim Williams (songwriter)